Middlesbrough Council is a unitary authority in North Yorkshire, England. Until 1 April 1996 it was a non-metropolitan district in Cleveland. Since 2002 it has also had a directly elected mayor.

Political control

Borough council
Since the first election to the council in 1973 political control of the council has been held by the following parties:

Non-metropolitan district

Unitary authority

Leadership
Since 2002, political leadership on the council has been provided by the directly elected Mayor of Middlesbrough. The mayors have been:

Council elections

Non-metropolitan district elections
1973 Middlesbrough Borough Council election
1976 Middlesbrough Borough Council election
1979 Middlesbrough Borough Council election (New ward boundaries)
1983 Middlesbrough Borough Council election
1987 Middlesbrough Borough Council election
1991 Middlesbrough Borough Council election

Unitary authority elections
1995 Middlesbrough Borough Council election
1999 Middlesbrough Borough Council election
2003 Middlesbrough Borough Council election (New ward boundaries)
2007 Middlesbrough Borough Council election
2011 Middlesbrough Borough Council election
2015 Middlesbrough Borough Council election (New ward boundaries)
2019 Middlesbrough Council election

Mayoral elections
Middlesbrough mayoral election, 2002
Middlesbrough mayoral election, 2007
Middlesbrough mayoral election, 2011
Middlesbrough mayoral election, 2015

By-election results

1995–1999

1999–2003

2003–2007

2007–2011

2011–2015

2015–2019

The by-election was caused by the resignation of Councillor Ansab Shan, a member of the Labour Party, to accept an appointment with the Crown Prosecution Service

The by-election was caused by the resignation of Councillor John Cole, Labour's chair of Middlesbrough Council’s planning committee. He did not give a reason. In 2012 his car had been subject to an arson attack, which also involved another councillor's car.

The by-election was caused by the death of Councillor Bernie Taylor.

The by-election was caused by the death of Councillor Peter Cox.

The by-election was caused by the death of Councillor Peter Purvis.

2019–2023

The by-election was caused by the resignation of Councillor Jan Mohan, citing health reasons.

The by-election was caused by the resignation of Councillor David Smith.

The by-election was caused by the death of Councillor June Goodchild.

The by-election was caused by the resignation of Councillor Ashley Waters.

References

External links
Middlesbrough Borough Council
By-election results

 
Council elections in North Yorkshire
Unitary authority elections in England
Council elections in Cleveland